Hypocrita arcaei is a moth of the family Erebidae. It was described by Herbert Druce in 1884. It is found in Panama, Costa Rica, Guatemala and Venezuela.

References

 

Hypocrita
Moths described in 1884